The 2021 WGC-FedEx St. Jude Invitational was a professional golf tournament being held August  at TPC Southwind in Memphis, Tennessee. It was the 23rd and final WGC Invitational tournament, the third of the World Golf Championships events in 2021. It was also the 64th year that the PGA Tour stopped in Memphis; dating back to the 1958 Memphis Open. The WGC Invitational was removed from the schedule in 2022, with the venue of the tournament hosting the FedEx St. Jude Championship, a FedEx Cup playoff event, ultimately replacing The Northern Trust.

Abraham Ancer won the event after making a birdie at the second hole of a sudden-death playoff against Sam Burns and Hideki Matsuyama. The three had tied at 264 after 72 holes, 16-under-par, a stroke ahead of Harris English, the first, second and third round leader.

Venue

Course layout 
TPC Southwind was designed by Ron Prichard, in consultation with tour pros Hubert Green and Fuzzy Zoeller. TPC Southwind opened in 1988, and is a member of the Tournament Players Club network operated by the PGA Tour.

Field 
The field consists of players drawn primarily from the Official World Golf Ranking and the winners of the worldwide tournaments with the strongest fields.

1. The top 50 players from the Official World Golf Ranking as of July 26, 2021.

Abraham Ancer (2)
Daniel Berger (2,3)
Sam Burns (2,3)
Patrick Cantlay (2,3)
Paul Casey (2,3)
Stewart Cink (2,3)
Corey Conners (2)
Bryson DeChambeau (2,3)
Harris English (2,3)
Tony Finau (2)
Matt Fitzpatrick (2,3)
Tommy Fleetwood (2)
Brian Harman (2)
Tyrrell Hatton (2,3)
Garrick Higgo (2,3)
Max Homa (2,3)
Billy Horschel (2,3)
Viktor Hovland (2,3)
Im Sung-jae (2)
Dustin Johnson (2,3)
Kevin Kisner (2)
Brooks Koepka (2,3)
Jason Kokrak (2,3)
Marc Leishman (2)
Shane Lowry (2)
Robert MacIntyre (2)
Hideki Matsuyama (2,3)
Rory McIlroy (2,3)
Phil Mickelson (2,3)
Collin Morikawa (2,3)
Kevin Na (2,3)
Joaquín Niemann (2)
Louis Oosthuizen (2)
Ryan Palmer (2)
Victor Perez (2)
Ian Poulter
Patrick Reed (2,3)
Justin Rose (2)
Xander Schauffele (2,3)
Scottie Scheffler (2)
Adam Scott (2)
Webb Simpson (2)
Cameron Smith (2)
Jordan Spieth (2,3)
Justin Thomas (2,3)
Lee Westwood (2)
Matthew Wolff (2)
Will Zalatoris (2)

Jon Rahm (2,3) did not play.
Christiaan Bezuidenhout (2) did not play.

2. The top 50 players from the Official World Golf Ranking as of August 2, 2021.

Lucas Herbert (3)

3. Tournament winners, whose victories are considered official, of tournaments from the Federation Tours since the prior season's WGC Invitational with an Official World Golf Ranking Strength of Field Rating of 115 points or more.'Cameron Champ
Cameron Davis
Sergio García
Lucas Glover
Jim Herman
Matt Jones
Kim Si-woo
Martin Laird
Lee Kyoung-hoon
Min Woo Lee
Carlos Ortiz
Aaron Rai
Robert Streb

4. The winner of selected tournaments or leaders in tour Order of Merit
 Asian Tour: 2020–21 Order of Merit leader – Wade Ormsby
 PGA Tour of Australasia: 2020–21 Order of Merit winner – Brad Kennedy
 Japan Golf Tour: Bridgestone Open (2020) – Canceled Japan Golf Tour: Japan Golf Tour Championship (2021) – Ryosuke Kinoshita
 Sunshine Tour: Dimension Data Pro-Am (2021) – Wilco Nienaber

Round summaries
First roundThursday, August 5, 2021Second roundFriday, August 6, 2021 Third round Saturday, August 7, 2021 Final round Sunday, August 8, 2021Final leaderboard

ScorecardCumulative tournament scores, relative to par''

Playoff

Notes

References

External links 
 
 Coverage on European Tour's official site
 TPC Southwind

WGC Invitational
WGC-Bridgestone Invitational
WGC-Bridgestone Invitational
WGC-Bridgestone Invitational
WGC-Bridgestone Invitational